FC Domodedovo Moscow was a Russian football team based in Domodedovo and officially registered in Moscow. It was founded in 2013 by twin player brothers Dmitri Kombarov and Kirill Kombarov. In 2014–15 season, it advanced to the professional level, the third-tier Russian Professional Football League. The club was dissolved following the 2016–17 season.

References

External links
  Official site

Association football clubs established in 2013
Association football clubs disestablished in 2017
Defunct football clubs in Russia
Football in Moscow Oblast
2013 establishments in Russia
2017 disestablishments in Russia